Ann Kathleen Richardson  is a New Zealand oncologist. She is professor of cancer epidemiology at the University of Canterbury.

Academic career
Richardson did a Bachelor of Medicine and Bachelor of Surgery, a Postgraduate Diploma in Obstetrics and a PhD, all at the University of Otago. She is a Fellow of the New Zealand College of Public Health Medicine. She is on the council of the Health Research Council of New Zealand and a trustee of the Genesis Oncology Trust.

In the 2008 Queen's Birthday Honours, Richardson was appointed a Companion of the Queen's Service Order, for services to public health.

Selected publications

References

New Zealand oncologists
Academic staff of the University of Canterbury
University of Otago alumni
New Zealand women academics
Living people
Year of birth missing (living people)
Companions of the Queen's Service Order